Soreng-Chakung Assembly constituency is one of the 32 assembly constituencies of Sikkim state of India. Soreng-Chakung is part of Sikkim Lok Sabha constituency.

Members of Legislative Assembly

Election results

2019

See also

 Soreng
 Chakung
 West Sikkim district
 List of constituencies of Sikkim Legislative Assembly

References

Assembly constituencies of Sikkim
Gyalshing district